Dawn in Darkness is the debut studio album by Australian singer and songwriter Mark Holden. The album was recorded and released in 1975.

In an interview with ABC's Talking Heads, Holden said that it sold about 2,000 copies only and was a 'big flop'  adding; "It was entirely original, all the songs I wrote as a kid. But it took me, got me out into the world. It got me into the game."

Background and release
In 1974, Holden entered Showcase '74, a television talent show on Network 9 where he sung original folky songs. Holden ultimately placed fifth, performing a track "Tap Dancing Down Easy Street" in the final. John Bromwell from Essex Music saw his performances and brought Holden to Sydney. Bromwell arranged an audition with Peter Dawkins a record producer with EMI Music who signed Holden. The album is a collection of songs Holden had written leading up to Showcase '74.

Track listing

References

Mark Holden albums
1975 debut albums
EMI Records albums
Pop albums by Australian artists